Kavandu is a village in Kambja Parish, Tartu County in eastern Estonia.

Kavandu is the birthplace of Ignatsi Jaak (ca 1670–1741; (:et)), a schoolteacher and sacristan, the most famous student of scholar Bengt Gottfried Forselius.

References

Villages in Tartu County